Adamn Killa is an American rapper from Chicago, Illinois. He is noted for his collaborations with rappers of the YEAR0001 collective Yung Lean and Bladee as well as his experimental approach to hip hop.

Career
In October 2015, he released his project Libra Season. In March 2016, he released his debut project Back 2 Ballin. In May 2016, he released his single "Ten" with Swedish rapper Yung Lean alongside an accompanying music video. In July 2016, he announced the release of his mixtape MR650 and released a single titled "Catch Me". In January 2017, he released the music video to his single "Commas" produced by producer Ryan Hemsworth. In June 2017, he released his 16-track project titled I Am Adamn. In December 2017, he released a joint project with American rapper and girlfriend at-the-time Killavesi titled Love Not A Killa. In March 2018, he released his project Adamn Everlasting (In Loving Memory of Jalen) with appearances from rappers Yung Lean, Riff Raff, Lil Reek, and Z Money.  In April 2020, he released his song "Hit the Adamn" along with an accompanying dance. In November 2021, he accused American rapper Lil Uzi Vert as well as DJ Drama and Don Cannon of scamming him of twenty thousand dollars for a feature.

References

External links 
 

21st-century American male musicians
Living people
People from Michigan
People from Detroit
Rappers from Detroit
Year of birth missing (living people)